Omar Abada (born 20 April 1993) is a Tunisian professional basketball player who plays for Al Wahda Damascus of the Syrian Basketball League. Abada also plays for the Tunisia national basketball team.

Born in Tunis, he started his career in 2010 with Étoile de Radès where he stayed for eight seasons. In 2018, Abada played a year in France for Saint-Chamond. A year later, he returned to Tunisia to play for US Monastir.

With Tunisia, he has won the AfroBasket tournament in 2017 and 2021, while being named to the All-Tournament Team in 2021.

Professional career
Abada started his career with Étoile de Radès in the Tunisian Championnat National A and helped the team win two national championships. In the 2017 FIBA Africa Champions Cup he was named to the All-Star Team.

In the 2018–19 season, Abada played one season in France for Saint-Chamond of the LNB Pro B, the national second tier.

In 2019, he returned to Tunisia to play for US Monastir. He played in the inaugural season of the Basketball Africa League (BAL) with Monastir and helped his team reach the Finals. After the tournament, he was named to the All-BAL First Team.

On January 16, 2022, Abada was announced by Zamalek to be on the roster for the 2022 FIBA Intercontinental Cup. However, he never joined the team or played in any game.

In April 2022, Abada joined the Syrian club Al Wahda Damascus of the Syrian Basketball League.

National team career
Abada has represented Tunisia's national basketball team at the 2015 FIBA Africa Championship in Radès, Tunisia. There, he recorded his team's best two point field goal percentage. At AfroBasket 2017 and AfroBasket 2021, he won gold.

BAL career statistics

|-
|style="text-align:left;"|2021
|style="text-align:left;"|Monastir
| 6 || 6 || 27.6 || .400 || .312 || .708 || 3.2 || 5.2 || 2.0 || .3 || 11.0
|- class="sortbottom"
| style="text-align:center;" colspan="2"|Career
| 6 || 6 || 27.6 || .400 || .312 || .708 || 3.2 || 5.2 || 2.0 || .3 || 11.0

Awards and accomplishments

Club
US Monastir
2× Championnat National A: (2020, 2021)
2× Tunisian Cup: (2020, 2021)
ES Radès
2× Championnat National A: (2020, 2021)
2× Tunisian Cup: (2017, 2018)

Individual
All-BAL First Team: (2021)
2× Tunisian Cup Final MVP: (2020, 2021)
FIBA Africa Clubs Champions Cup All-Star Team: (2017)
3× Championnat National A Best Guard: (2017, 2018, 2020)
Championnat National A Best Tunisian Player: (2017)

References

External links
Afrobasket.com Profile
Omar Abada Afrobasket 2015 HD - Youtube.com Video

1993 births
Living people
2019 FIBA Basketball World Cup players
Competitors at the 2013 Mediterranean Games
Mediterranean Games bronze medalists for Tunisia
Mediterranean Games medalists in basketball
Point guards
Saint-Chamond Basket players
Sportspeople from Tunis
Tunisian expatriate basketball people in France
Tunisian men's basketball players
US Monastir basketball players
Al Wahda men's basketball players
Al-Ittihad Jeddah basketball players
ES Radès basketball players